There are over 20,000 Grade II* listed buildings in England. This page is a list of these buildings in the district of North Warwickshire in Warwickshire.

North Warwickshire

|}

Notes

External links

North Warwickshire
 North
Borough of North Warwickshire